Breitenbach is a river of Rhineland-Palatinate, Germany, a left tributary of the Speyerbach.

The Breitenbach rises in the central Palatine Forest in the valley of Dreibrunnental ("Three Springs Valley") and flows towards the south, where it forms the parish boundary between Elmstein and Esthal almost throughout. On the way it passes the Goldbrunnen spring. The timber rafting station there is classed as a cultural monument; in the immediate vicinity of the confluence are the ruins of Breitenstein Castle.

Tributaries 
Finster-Breitenbach (right), 1.3 km
Großer Schwabenbach (right), 1.7 km

References 

Rivers of Rhineland-Palatinate
Palatinate Forest
Bad Dürkheim (district)
Rivers of Germany